Ashraf Youssef (born 5 October 1965), is a former Egyptian professional footballer. He played for Minya and Zamalek as a defender.

International career
He represented Egypt in the 1994 African Cup of Nations.

Honours
Zamalek
Egyptian Premier League: 2
 1991–92, 1992–93
African Cup of Champions Clubs: 1
 1993
CAF Super Cup: 1
1994

References

1965 births
Zamalek SC players
Ismaily SC players
Egyptian footballers
1994 African Cup of Nations players
Living people
Egyptian Premier League players
Association football defenders